Gondia Airport is located at Birsi village, 12 kilometres north-east of Gondia, Maharashtra, India. It is a domestic airport serving Gondia city and surrounding areas and also used for general aviation and pilot training.

History
The airstrip was built by the British in 1940. Initially run by the Public Works Department, it was taken over by the state-owned Maharashtra Industrial Development Corporation (MIDC) in August 1998 to December 2005, after which it has been operated by the Airports Authority of India (AAI). The AAI extended the runway at Gondia airport to 7,500 feet to handle larger aircraft such as Airbus A320 and Boeing 737.

Description
Gondia airport has a single runway (04/22), 2,290 metres long and 45 metres wide with a parallel taxiway of 1,697 metres.
The main apron measures 100 m x 150 m. The airport is equipped with a Non Directional Beacon and DVOR, Distance Measuring Equipment, Instrument Landing System and night landing facilities.

Airlines and destinations

National Flying Training Institute (NFTI)
CAE Global Academy Gondia / NFTI commenced operations at Gondia Airport after receiving Directorate General of Civil Aviation (DGCA) approval on 19 February 2009. The academy is a joint venture between the Airports Authority of India (AAI) and CAE Inc. The Gondia school is one of 11 members of the CAE Global Academy network.

References

Maharashtra
Airports in Maharashtra
Vidarbha
Airports established in 1940
1940 establishments in British India
20th-century architecture in India